The National Military Reserve was a reserve force of the New Zealand Military Forces. It was formed just prior to the Second World War and intended to provide a reserve pool of manpower to supplement the Territorial Force. The National Military Reserve consisted of a number of independent infantry companies and battalions, as well as independent Mounted rifle squadrons. In 1942 the New Zealand Government rationalised the reserve system. The National Military Reserve was disbanded and most of the constituent units were transferred to the Territorial Force.

History
By 1939, the New Zealand Government was becoming increasingly concerned about the likelihood of war in Europe. It was therefore decided to expand the New Zealand Military Forces and in May 1939 a major reorganisation was undertaken. The territorial forces were expanded and a new reserve force called the National Military Reserve was formed. The National Military Reserve was to act as a pool of manpower for the Territorial Force in the event of war and also provide a force of less able men for menial work. Recruits were designated into three classes:
 Class I: men aged 20–35 with two years experience in the territorial force
 Class II: men aged 35–55 with regular or NZEF experience
 Class III: any other men aged 33–55

With the out break of war on 3 September 1939, the National Military Reserve was activated. The majority of men in class I were immediately transferred to the Territorial Force, while the roughly 11,000 class II men were called up to provide garrison troops to defend ports and other key points in New Zealand. In July 1940, the National Military Reserve was organised into independent squadrons of mounted rifles, independent companies and battalions of infantry. Further units were raised throughout 1940 and 1941 and by January 1942 the establishment of the National Military Reserve was 21,261. New Zealand was suffering from manpower shortages and such a large force could not be maintained. Consequently, 12 of the independent companies were disbanded, however a larger change soon followed. At the beginning of 1942 the New Zealand Home defence forces consisted of three organisations: the Territorial force, the National Military Reserve and the Home Guard. The government felt that this was too complicated and decided to simplify the home defence forces into two lines: the first line (i.e. the Territorial Force) of fitter men and the second line (i.e. the Home Guard). Consequently, the NMR was disbanded and its units transferred to the Territorial Force. The Territorial force itself was stood down in 1943 and by April 1944 all the former National Military Reserve units had been disbanded.

List of units of the National Military reserve

Mounted Rifle Squadrons
All 9 independent mounted rifles companies were formed on 1 July 1940. They were transferred to the Territorial Force on 10 January 1942 and later attached to the Home Guard in May 1943.

Independent Infantry Companies
A total of 21 independent infantry companies were formed, of which 12 were disbanded on 1 January 1942, and the remainder transferred to the territorial force on 2 February 1942

Infantry Battalions
A total of 22 infantry battalions were formed and were transferred to the territorial force on 2 February 1942

Notes
 Footnotes

 Citations

 References

Military units and formations of the New Zealand Army
Military units and formations established in 1939
Military units and formations disestablished in 1942